= Operation Numkhor =

Indian Customs enforcement operation

- Operation name: Operation Numkhor
- Type: Customs enforcement operation
- Scope: Kerala, India (with alleged links to the Indo–Bhutan border)

Participants
- Initiated by: Commissionerate of Customs (Preventive), Kochi
- Executed by: Commissionerate of Customs (Preventive), Kochi

Mission
- Objective: To identify and seize vehicles alleged to have been illegally imported into India from Bhutan using forged documentation and to investigate associated customs duty and tax evasion.
- Method: Searches/raids, document verification, seizure of vehicles, and questioning of owners and intermediaries

Timeline
- Date begin: 2025

Results
- Miscellaneous results: Dozens of vehicles seized; investigations and adjudication proceedings ongoing (as of January 2026)

Operation Numkhor is a law enforcement operation launched in September 2025 by the Commissionerate of Customs (Preventive), Kochi, in the Indian state of Kerala. The operation targets an alleged network involved in the illegal import of luxury and second-hand vehicles into India from Bhutan, with authorities alleging the use of forged documents and irregular registrations to evade customs duty and domestic taxes. The term numkhor was reported by customs officials and Indian media to mean "vehicle" in Dzongkha, the national language of Bhutan.

The initial searches covered more than 30 locations across Kerala and resulted in the seizure of 36 vehicles on the first day, with later reporting putting the total at 38 within two days and 43 by 9 October 2025. As of January 2026, customs officials stated that the investigation and documentation checks were continuing, including the issuance of show-cause notices and verification with transport authorities and other government offices.

== Background ==
According to the Customs (Preventive) Commissioner for Kochi, the operation followed intelligence inputs, including information from the Directorate of Revenue Intelligence (DRI), that high-end vehicles were being brought into India via the Indo–Bhutan border and then circulated in Kerala. Customs and media reports described several alleged methods for bringing vehicles into India, including importation in "completely knocked down" condition inside containers and the use of vehicles disguised as tourist vehicles that were not taken back across the border.

Customs officials alleged that forged documentation was used to register or re-register some vehicles in India, and that a large share of the vehicles under scrutiny were registered under false names or addresses.

== Operation ==
=== Launch and searches ===
The operation began on 23 September 2025, with coordinated searches reported at more than 30 locations across Kerala, including Kochi, Thiruvananthapuram, Kozhikode and Malappuram. Searches were conducted with support from Kerala state agencies including the transport commissionerate, the Anti-Terror Squad and the state police.

Residences of several high-profile individuals, including Malayalam film actors, were among the locations searched.

=== Seizures and follow-up actions ===
Seizure of 36 premium vehicles were reported on 23 September 2025, with subsequent seizures bringing the reported total to 43 by 9 October 2025. On 8 October 2025, The Times of India reported that customs had provisionally released 33 of 39 seized vehicles to their owners for safe custody under Section 110A of the Customs Act, subject to conditions including secure parking and a prohibition on using the vehicles while adjudication was pending.
